Ocean City Residential Historic District consists of 169 properties, dating back to the 1880s, located in Ocean City, New Jersey. The district was added to the National Register of Historic Places on March 20, 2003.

History
Before Ocean City, New Jersey was founded, several families lived on the barrier island, then known as Peck's Beach. In 1879, a group of eight Methodist ministers founded the New Brighton Association as a land development company. On October 20 of that year, the group founded the Ocean City Association to develop the island as a religious resort, with a grid plan of streets running parallel to, and intersecting, each other. On May 25 of the following year, the Association began selling lots in the northern portion of the island, centered around a campground area between what is now Fifth and Sixth Streets. If buyers failed to adhere to the Association's moral code, than the property would be returned to the Association. In 1880 alone, buyers built 35 houses, along a hotel, two bath houses, and ten private stables.

A total of 32 houses built in the 1880s are part of the current historic district, including one built by Ocean City Association member Ezra B. Lake. More houses were built in the succeeding decades, aided by improved transportation. By the 1920s, most available lots in the originally settled northern portion of Ocean City were already built. The city's growth halted in 1929 following the stock market crash and subsequent Great Depression.

In the 1980s, developers began tearing down older structures and rebuilding them as duplexes. In 1988, Ocean City added a Historic Preservation Plan Element to its master plan. Three years later, the city designated the Ocean City Residential Historic District from Third to Eighth Streets, and along Wesley, Ocean, and Central Avenues; also included in the District was the Life-Saving Station at 4th and Atlantic.

List of homes in the district

Other properties
The Ocean City Residential Historic District is centered around an open area between 5th and Sixth Streets. In 1881, an auditorium was built between Fifth and Sixth Streets, which became the Ocean City Tabernacle; the building was replaced in 1955 by another building at the same location.

At the intersection of 8th Street and Central Avenue, St. Peter's United Methodist Church was built in 1908 in a Gothic Revival architecture. Originally, it was a two-story building, with a three-story tower, with a two-story addition built in 1956. The church's foundation is made of cast stone and granite, and the building's exterior wall is made of stone, featuring stained glass windows. The roof is cross-gabled, with a raised parapet, pinnacles, and a bell tower. It is a key contributing property to the district.

See also
National Register of Historic Places listings in Cape May County, New Jersey

External links

References

Historic districts on the National Register of Historic Places in New Jersey
Houses on the National Register of Historic Places in New Jersey
Geography of Cape May County, New Jersey
Ocean City, New Jersey
National Register of Historic Places in Cape May County, New Jersey
Houses in Cape May County, New Jersey
New Jersey Register of Historic Places